Mitch Thomas (born 4 May 1998) is an Australian curler who has represented Australia in the 2013, 2014 and 2015 Pacific-Asia Junior Curling Championships as well as the 2016, 2017 and 2018 World Junior B Curling Championships.

References

External links
 

Australian male curlers
1998 births
Living people
Sportsmen from Queensland
Sportspeople from Sydney